Jayadeb  is a 1962 Odia film directed by Byomkesh Tripathi about Jayadeva a well known Sanskrit poet and lyricist of Orissa

Cast
 Sahu Samuel
 Miss Shefali
 Byomkesh Tripathi

References

1962 films
1960s Odia-language films